The Archdiocese of Chicago is a Latin Church ecclesiastical jurisdiction or archdiocese of the Catholic Church located in Northeastern Illinois, in the United States. It was established as a diocese in 1843 and elevated to an archdiocese in 1880. The archdiocese is divided into six vicariates and 31 deaneries.

Blase Joseph Cupich was appointed Archbishop of Chicago in 2014 (and Cardinal in 2016) by Pope Francis, and is assisted by six episcopal vicars, who are each responsible for a vicariate (region).  The cathedral parish for the archdiocese, Holy Name Cathedral, is in the Near North Side area of the see city for the diocese, Chicago.  The Archdiocese of Chicago is the metropolitan see of the Province of Chicago. Its suffragan dioceses are the other Catholic dioceses in Illinois: Belleville, Joliet, Peoria, Rockford, and Springfield.

Joseph Cardinal Bernardin, Archbishop of Chicago from 1982 to 1996, was arguably one of the most prominent figures in the Church in the United States in the post-Vatican II era, rallying progressives with his "seamless garment ethic" and his ecumenical initiatives.

Diocesan history

Arrival of missionaries

A French Jesuit missionary, the Rev. Jacques Marquette, SJ, first explored the area that is now Chicago in the mid-17th century. On December 4, 1674, Father Marquette arrived at the mouth of the Chicago River where he built a cabin to recuperate from his travels. His cabin became the first European settlement in the area now known as Chicago. Marquette published his survey of the new territories and soon more French missionaries and settlers arrived.

First priest
In 1795, the Potawatomi tribe signed the Treaty of Greenville that ceded to the United States a tract of land at the mouth of the Chicago River. There in 1804, Fort Dearborn was erected and protected newly arrived Catholic pioneers. In 1822, Alexander Beaubien became the first person to be baptized in Chicago. In 1833, Jesuit missionaries wrote a letter to the Most Rev. Joseph Rosati, Bishop of Saint Louis and Vicar General of Bardstown, pleading for the appointment of a resident pastor to serve over one hundred professing Roman Catholics living in Chicago. Rosati appointed a diocesan priest, the Rev. John Mary Irenaeus Saint Cyr. Fr. Saint Cyr celebrated his first Mass in a log cabin owned by the Beaubien family on Lake Street, near Market Street, in 1833.

First parish

It was dedicated in October 1833. The following year, Bishop Simon Bruté of Vincennes visited Chicago, where he found over 400 Catholics with only one priest to serve them. The bishop asked permission from Bishop Rosati to send Fathers Fischer, Shaefer, Saint Palais, Dupontavice, and Joliet from Vincennes to tend to the needs of the Chicago region. In 1837, Fr. Saint Cyr was allowed to retire and was replaced by Chicago's first English-speaking priest, the Rev. James Timothy O'Meara. Father O'Meara moved the church built by Fr. Saint Cyr to what is now the intersection of Wabash Avenue and Madison Street. When Fr. O'Meara left Chicago, Saint Palais demolished the church and replaced it with a new brick structure.

Diocesan establishment
The First Plenary Council of Baltimore concluded that the Roman Catholic population of Chicago was growing exponentially and was in dire need of an episcopal see of its own. With the consent of Pope Gregory XVI, the Diocese of Chicago was canonically erected on November 28, 1843. In 1844, William Quarter of Ireland was appointed as the first Bishop of Chicago. Upon his arrival, Quarter summoned a synod of 32 Chicago priests to begin the organization of the diocese. One of Quarter's most important achievements was his successful petitioning for the passage of an Illinois law in 1845 that declared the Bishop of Chicago an incorporated entity, a corporation sole, with power to hold real and other property in trust for religious purposes. This allowed the bishop to pursue large-scale construction of new churches, colleges, and universities to serve the needs of Chicago's Roman Catholic faithful. After four years of service as Bishop of Chicago, Bishop Quarter died on April 10, 1848.

Fire of 1871
The church lost nearly a million dollars in church property in the Chicago fire of 1871, leading to administrative instability for decades.

Archdiocese establishment
The southern section of the state of Illinois split from Chicago diocese in 1853, becoming the Diocese of Quincy. The Quincy diocese was renamed the Diocese of Alton in 1857, and eventually became the Diocese of Springfield. The Diocese of Peoria was established in 1877 from another territorial split from the Chicago diocese.

From 1844 to 1879, the diocesan bishop of the Diocese of Chicago held the title Bishop of Chicago. With the elevation of the diocese to an archdiocese in 1880, the diocesan bishop held the title Archbishop of Chicago. Since 1915, all Archbishops of Chicago have been honored in consistory with the title of Cardinal Priest and membership in the College of Cardinals. The archbishops also have responsibilities in the dicasteries of the Roman Curia. All but two diocesan bishops were diocesan priests before assuming the episcopacy in Chicago. Two came from religious institutes: the Society of Jesus (James Van de Velde) and the Missionary Oblates of Mary Immaculate (Francis George).

28th International Eucharistic Congress 
In 1926, the archdiocese hosted the 28th International Eucharistic Congress.

Our Lady of the Angels fire

A fire occurred at Our Lady of Angels School on December 1, 1958, in the Humboldt Park area of western Chicago. The school, operated by the Archdiocese, lost 92 students and three nuns in five classrooms on the second floor.

In 1959 the National Fire Protection Association's report on the blaze blamed civic authorities and the Archdiocese of Chicago for "housing their children in fire traps" – their words – such as Our Lady of the Angels School. The report noted that both the Chicago School Board and the Archdiocese continued to allow some schools to be legally operated despite having inadequate fire safety standards.

Churches

Archbishop's Residence
 
The Archbishop's Residence at 1555 North State Parkway is the official home of the Archbishop of Chicago and is listed on the National Register of Historic Places. Built in 1885 by the Most Rev. Patrick Feehan, first Archbishop of Chicago, it is a three-story, red brick building and is one of the oldest structures in the Astor Street District, according to the Landmarks Preservation Council.

When Pope John Paul II visited Chicago in 1979, he became the first Pontiff to stay at the residence, though two previous popes had stayed there as cardinals: Eugenio Cardinal Pacelli, who became Pope Pius XII; and Giovanni Cardinal Montini, who became Pope Paul VI.

Before the establishment of the Archbishop's Residence, the Bishops of Chicago were in residence at a home on LaSalle Street and North Avenue.

All archbishops of Chicago lived at the mansion until the appointment of the ninth and current archbishop, Blase Cupich, who chose to live at the Holy Name Cathedral rectory.

Bishops

Bishops of Chicago
 William J. Quarter (1844–1848)
 James Oliver Van de Velde, S.J. (1848–1853), appointed Bishop of Natchez
 Anthony O'Regan (1854–1858)
 James Duggan (1859–1880)

Archbishops of Chicago
 Patrick Augustine Feehan (1880–1902)
 James Edward Quigley (1903–1915)
 Cardinal George Mundelein (1915–1939)
 Cardinal Samuel Stritch (1939–1958), appointed Pro-Prefect of the Sacred Congregation for the Propagation of the Faith
 Cardinal Albert Gregory Meyer (1958–1965)
 Cardinal John Cody (1965–1982)
 Cardinal Joseph Bernardin (1982–1996)
 Cardinal Francis George, OMI (1997–2014)
 Cardinal Blase J. Cupich (2014–present)

Current auxiliary bishops
 Joseph N. Perry (1998–present)
 Andrew Peter Wypych (2011–present)
 Mark Andrew Bartosic (2018–present)
 Robert Gerald Casey (2018–present)
 Jeffrey S. Grob (2020–present)
 Kevin M. Birmingham (2020–present)
 Robert J. Lombardo (2020–present)

Former auxiliary bishops

 Alexander Joseph McGavick (1899–1921), appointed Bishop of La Crosse
 Peter Muldoon (1901–1908), appointed Bishop of Rockford
 Paul Peter Rhode (1908–1915), appointed Bishop of Green Bay
 Edward Francis Hoban (1922–1928), appointed Bishop of Rockford and later Bishop of Cleveland
 Bernard James Sheil (1928–1969), appointed Archbishop ad personam in 1959
 William David O'Brien (1934–1962)
 William Edward Cousins (1948–1952), appointed Bishop of Peoria and later Archbishop of Milwaukee
 Raymond Peter Hillinger (1956–1971), appointed Bishop of Rockford
 Cletus F. O'Donnell (1960–1967), appointed Bishop of Madison
 Aloysius John Wycislo (1960–1968), appointed Bishop of Green Bay
 Romeo Roy Blanchette (1965–1966), appointed Bishop of Joliet
 John L. May (1967–1969), appointed Bishop of Mobile and later Archbishop of St. Louis
 Thomas Joseph Grady (1967–1974), appointed Bishop of Orlando
 William Edward McManus (1967–1976), appointed Bishop of Fort Wayne-South Bend
 Michael Dempsey (1968–1974)
 Alfred Leo Abramowicz (1968–1995)
 Nevin William Hayes, O. Carm. (1971–1988)
 Plácido Rodriguez, C.M.F. (1983–1994), appointed Bishop of Lubbock
 Wilton D. Gregory (1983–1994), appointed Bishop of Belleville and later Archbishop of Atlanta and Archbishop of Washington
 Timothy Joseph Lyne (1983–2013)
 John R. Gorman (1988–2003)
 Thad J. Jakubowski (1988–2003)
 Raymond E. Goedert (1991–2003)
 Gerald Frederick Kicanas (1995–2002), appointed Bishop of Tucson
 Edwin Michael Conway (1995–2004)
 George V. Murry, SJ (1995–1998), appointed Coadjutor Bishop of St. Thomas and subsequently succeeded to that see
 John R. Manz (1996–2021)
 Jerome Edward Listecki (2000–2004), appointed Bishop of La Crosse and later Archbishop of Milwaukee
 Thomas J. Paprocki (2003–2010), appointed Bishop of Springfield in Illinois
 Francis J. Kane (2003–2018)
 George J. Rassas (2006–2018)
 Alberto Rojas (2011–2019), appointed Coadjutor Bishop of San Bernardino and subsequently succeeded to that see
 Ronald Aldon Hicks (2018–2020), appointed Bishop of Joliet

Other priests of this diocese who became bishops
 Peter Joseph Baltes, appointed Bishop of Alton in 1869
 John McMullen, appointed Bishop of Davenport in 1881
 Maurice Francis Burke, appointed Bishop of Cheyenne in 1887
 Edward Joseph Dunne, appointed Bishop of Dallas in 1893
 Thaddeus Joseph Butler, appointed Bishop of Concordia in 1897 (died before consecration)
 Edmund Michael Dunne, appointed Bishop of Peoria in 1909
 Stanislaus Vincent Bona, appointed Bishop of Grand Island in 1931
 Moses Elias Kiley, appointed Bishop of Trenton in 1934
 Francis Joseph Magner, appointed Bishop of Marquette in 1940
 Patrick Thomas Brennan, S.S.C.M.E. (priest here, 1928–1936), appointed Prefect of Kwoszu, Korea (South) in 1948
 Martin Dewey McNamara, appointed Bishop of Joliet in Illinois in 1948
 William Aloysius O'Connor, appointed Bishop of Springfield in Illinois in 1948
 Donald Martin Carroll, appointed Bishop of Rockford in 1956 (did not take effect)
 Ernest John Primeau, appointed Bishop of Manchester in 1959
 Romeo Roy Blanchette, appointed Auxiliary Bishop of Joliet in Illinois in 1965
 Raymond James Vonesh, appointed Auxiliary Bishop of Joliet in Illinois in 1968
 Paul Casimir Marcinkus, appointed titular Archbishop in 1968
 Thomas Joseph Murphy, appointed Bishop of Great Falls in 1978
 John Richard Keating, appointed Bishop of Arlington in 1983
 James Patrick Keleher, appointed Bishop of Belleville in 1984
 Edward Michael Egan, appointed Auxiliary Bishop of New York in 1985; future Cardinal
 Edward James Slattery, appointed Bishop of Tulsa in 1993
 Edward Kenneth Braxton. appointed Auxiliary Bishop of St. Louis in 1995
 Robert Emmet Barron, appointed Auxiliary Bishop of Los Angeles in 2015
 Michael G. McGovern, appointed Bishop of Belleville in 2020
Louis Tylka, appointed Coadjutor Bishop of Peoria in 2020

Structure of the archdiocese

Administration

The Archdiocese Pastoral Centers are Archbishop Quigley Center, 835 North Rush Street and Cardinal Meyer Center, 3525 South Lake Park Avenue, both in Chicago.

Administrative Council to the Archbishop

Most Reverend Robert Casey, Vicar General
Stephen Kanonik, Moderator of the Curia
Daniel Welter, Chancellor
Jeffrey S. Grob, Auxiliary Bishop, Episcopal Vicar, Vicariate I
Mark A. Bartosic, Auxiliary Bishop, Episcopal Vicar, Vicariate II
Robert J. Lombardo, CFR, Auxiliary Bishop, Episcopal Vicar, Vicariate III
Kevin M. Birmingham, Auxiliary Bishop, Episcopal Vicar, Vicariate IV
Andrew P. Wypych, Auxiliary Bishop, Episcopal Vicar, Vicariate V
Joseph N. Perry, Auxiliary Bishop, Episcopal Vicar, Vicariate VI
Thomas A. Baima, Vice Rector for Academic Affairs, University of St. Mary of the Lake / Mundelein Seminary
Michael M. Boland, Director, Catholic Charities
Betsy Bohlen, Chief Financial Officer
George Puszka, Director, Finance
Christopher J. Cannova, Department of Personnel Services
Peter de Keartry, Interim-Director, Department of Human Services
Peter Wojik, Director, Department of Parish Vitality and Mission
Jim Rigg, Superintendent, Archdiocesan Board of Catholic Education

Departments
Departments, agencies and offices include:

Amate House
Archdiocesan Council of Catholic Women
Archives and Records, Assistance Ministry
Catechesis
Catholic Cemeteries
Catholic Charities of the Archdiocese of Chicago
Catholic Chaplaincy at O'Hare
Catholic Schools
Chancellor
Communications and Public Relations
Conciliation
Diaconate
Divine Worship
Ecumenical and Interreligious Affairs
Family Ministries
Financial Services
Food Service Professionals
Formation, Lay Ecclesial Ministry
Legal Services
Liturgy Training Publications
Metropolitan Tribunal
Ministerial Evaluation
Ministry in Higher Education
Office of Catholic Schools
Office for Ecumenical and Interreligious Affairs 
Office for Evangelization and Missionary Discipleship
Office of Information Technology
Office for Peace and Justice
Office for Persons with Disabilities
Office of Professional Responsibility
Ongoing Formation in Ministry
Parish Life and Formation
The Protection of Children and Youth
Racial Justice
Research and Planning
Respect Life
Stewardship and Development
Vocations
Young Adult Ministry
Youth Ministry Office.

Office of Catholic Schools

The Office of Catholic Schools operates, manages, and supports diocesan and Catholic primary and secondary schools. Catholic education in the Chicago area began on June 3, 1844 with the opening of a boys' school. Chicago parochial schools served various ethnic groups, including Irish, Germans, Poles, Czechs and Bohemians, French, Slovaks, Lithuanians, Puerto Rican Americans, African Americans, Italians, and Mexicans. Many local nuns living in convents established and operated Catholic schools.

The school construction boom ended when Cardinal John Cody, archbishop at the time, decided to limit construction of Catholic schools in Lake County and suburban areas in Cook County. Due to changes in demographics, the archdiocese has since closed more than half of its urban schools since 1966.

Between 1984 and 2004, the Office of Catholic Schools closed 148 schools and 10 school sites. An August 27, 2015, article in the Chicago Tribune refers to the Archdiocese of Chicago Office of Catholic Schools as the largest private school system in the United States. At the outset of the 2020/21 academic year, the archdiocese ran 160 elementary schools and three high schools. An additional eight Catholic elementary schools and 28 Catholic high schools that are not archdiocesan-run are located within the Archdiocese of Chicago. , the Superintendent of Catholic Schools is Jim Rigg, Ph.D.

In January 2018, the Archdiocese announced the closure of five of its schools. In January 2020, the Archdiocese announced the permanent closure of five of its other schools. As of 2022, there are 33 Catholic high schools currently operating in Cook and Lake counties, seven all-girl high schools, seven all-boys high schools and 19 co-ed high schools.

Respect Life Office
Cardinal Francis George established the Respect Life Office within the archdiocese. "It promotes the cause of life through advocacy and prayer. It has available educational resources, a speakers bureau and sponsors annual conferences, retreats and rallies for adults and youth. The Office also maintains Project Rachel, a program of reconciliation for those who participated in an abortion; and the Chastity Education Initiative, which serves youth and young adults of the Archdiocese, inspiring them to make positive choices about the gift of human sexuality."

The Respect Life Office has coordinated several anti-abortion initiatives in the Chicago area. These include the local 40 Days for Life campaign, annual trip to the March for Life in both Chicago and Washington, DC, for college and high school students.

Seminaries
University of Saint Mary of the Lake (Mundelein Seminary) – major seminary
St. Joseph College Seminary – undergraduate seminary program of the Archdiocese of Chicago (affiliated with Loyola University Chicago) ((closed 2019))
Archbishop Quigley Preparatory Seminary – high-school seminary (closed 2007)

Province of Chicago

Diocese of Belleville
Diocese of Joliet in Illinois
Diocese of Peoria
Diocese of Rockford
Diocese of Springfield in Illinois

See also

:Category:Roman Catholic Archdiocese of Chicago
The Catholic New World, the official newspaper of the Archdiocese
Our Lady of Perpetual Help (Glenview, Illinois), one of the largest parishes in the Archdiocese
Polish Cathedral style churches of Chicago
St. Anne Catholic Community, another of the largest parishes in the Archdiocese
Ukrainian Catholic Eparchy of Chicago
Syro-Malabar Catholic Diocese of Saint Thomas the Apostle of Chicago
List of the Roman Catholic bishops of the United States
List of the Roman Catholic cathedrals of the United States
List of the Roman Catholic dioceses of the United States
United States Conference of Catholic Bishops
Sexual abuse scandal in the Catholic archdiocese of Chicago
Shrine of Christ the King, Sovereign Priest; in Chicago, Illinois

References

Further reading
 Coughlin, Roger J. Charitable Care in the Archdiocese of Chicago (Chicago: The Catholic Charities, 2009)
 Dahm, Charles W. Power and Authority in the Catholic Church: Cardinal Cody in Chicago (University of Notre Dame Press, 1981)
 Faraone, Dominic E. "Urban Rifts and Religious Reciprocity: Chicago and the Catholic Church, 1965–1996." (2013, PhD, Marquette University); Bibliography pages 359–86. online
 Garrathan, Gilbert J. The Catholic Church in Chicago, 1673–1871 (Loyola University Press, 1921)
 Greeley, Andrew M. Chicago Catholics and the struggles within their Church (Transaction Publishers, 2011)
 Hoy, Suellen. Good Hearts: Catholic Sisters in Chicago's Past (University of Illinois Press, 2006)
 Kantowicz, Edward R. Corporation Sole: Cardinal Mundelein and Chicago Catholicism (University of Notre Dame Press, 1983)
 Kantowicz, Edward R. The Archdiocese of Chicago: A Journey of Faith (Ireland: Booklink, 2006)
 Kelliher, Thomas G. Hispanic Catholics and the Archidiocese of Chicago, 1923–1970 (PhD Diss. UMI, Dissertation Services, 1998)
 Kennedy, Eugene. This Man Bernardin (Loyola U. Press, 1996)
 Koenig, Rev. Msgr. Harry C., S.T.D., ed. Caritas Christi Urget Nos: A History of the Offices, Agencies, and Institutions of the Archdiocese of Chicago (2 vols. Catholic Bishop of Chicago, 1981)
 Koenig, Rev. Msgr. Harry C., S.T.D., ed.  A History of the Parishes of the Archdiocese of Chicago. (2 vols. Catholic Bishop of Chicago, 1980)
 McMahon, Eileen M. What Parish Are You From?: A Chicago Irish Community and Race Relations (University Press of Kentucky, 1995)
 Neary, Timothy B. "Black-Belt Catholic Space: African-American Parishes in Interwar Chicago." US Catholic Historian (2000): 76–91.  in JSTOR
 Parot, Joseph John. Polish Catholics in Chicago: 1850–1920: a Religious History (Northern Illinois University Press, 1981.)
 Reiff, Janice L.  et al., eds. The Encyclopedia of Chicago (University of Chicago Press, 2004) online
 Sanders, James W. The education of an urban minority: Catholics in Chicago, 1833–1965 (Oxford University Press, 1977)
 Shanabruch, Charles. Chicago's Catholics: The evolution of an American identity (Univ of Notre Dame Press, 1981)
 Skerrett, Ellen. "The Catholic Dimension." in Lawrence J. McCaffrey et al. eds. The Irish in Chicago (University of Illinois Press, 1987)
 Skerrett, Ellen. Chicago's Neighborhoods and the Eclipse of Sacred Space (University of Notre Dame Press, 1994)
 Skerrett, Ellen. et al. eds., Catholicism, Chicago Style (Loyola University Press, 1993)
 Skok, Deborah A. More Than Neighbors: Catholic Settlements and Day Nurseries in Chicago, 1893–1930 (Northern Illinois University Press, 2007)
 Wall, A.E.P. The Spirit of Cardinal Bernardin (Chicago: Thomas More Press, 1983)

External links

 Roman Catholic Archdiocese of Chicago Official Site
 

 
Chicago
Christianity in Chicago
Religious organizations established in 1843
Chicago
Religious organizations based in Chicago
1843 establishments in Illinois